Craig Dunlea is a rugby union prop who was born in Leeston, New Zealand on 2 June 1976.

He is a former representative of the Scarlets, a Welsh club who compete in the Celtic League, EDF Energy Cup and the Heineken Cup. For the club, he played 30 games, between December 2005 and May 2007, scoring 3 tries.

1976 births
Living people
New Zealand rugby union players
Scarlets players
People from Leeston
New Zealand expatriate sportspeople in Wales